George Wheeler Roark (October 7, 1898 – March 31, 1993) was an American football, basketball, and baseball player and coach of football, basketball, and track.  He served as the head football coach at Westminster College of New Wilmington, Pennsylvania in 1936 and at Washington & Jefferson College from 1937 to 1940, compiling a career college football record of 18–18–3.  Roark also coached basketball and track at Westminster.

Roark was a native of Altavista, Virginia.  He attended Bethany College in West Virginia, where he lettered in football, basketball, and baseball, and graduated with the class of 1925.  He played catcher on the baseball team with pitcher Ed Wells, who went on to play Major League Baseball.  Roarke resigned from his post at Washington & Jefferson in December 1940 to coach football at New Brighton, Pennsylvania's high school, where he had coached football and basketball from 1930 to 1935.  In his first stint at New Brighton, his football teams tallied a mark of 33–9–3.

Head coaching record

College

References

1898 births
1993 deaths
American men's basketball players
Baseball catchers
Basketball coaches from Virginia
Basketball players from Virginia
Forwards (basketball)
Bethany Bison baseball players
Bethany Bison football players
Bethany Bison men's basketball players
Washington & Jefferson Presidents football coaches
Westminster Titans football coaches
Westminster Titans men's basketball coaches
College track and field coaches in the United States
High school basketball coaches in the United States
High school football coaches in Pennsylvania
High school football coaches in West Virginia
People from Altavista, Virginia